Warden Law is a village and civil parish in the City of Sunderland in Tyne and Wear, England. It is south-west of Sunderland city centre.  It has a population of 33. At the 2011 Census the population remained less than 100. Details were included in the civil parish of Hetton.

It is home to a karting track called Karting North East and the Warden Law Kart Club.

Just over the hill is a new children's farm activity centre Down at the Farm

The site is also the location of several prehistoric burial sites and other neolithic groundworks and remains.

The site was also the location of the Warden Law winding engine from 1822 until 1959 which was used by the Hetton Coal Company railway to power one of the very earliest non animal powered railways seen anywhere in the world.

History
The earliest reference to the village can be found in the Boldon Book of 1183, "In Warden Law there are 9 leaseholders who hold 18 bovates each of 13 1/2 acres and pay 8d for each bovate and they work 20 days in the autumn with one man for each bovate and they harrow for 4 days with 1 horse for every 2 bovates."

15th century records of John Wessington reported on by James Raine in the 19th century appear to show the hill within the village as being the place of the epiphany of Aldhun of Durham, the place where Aldhun claimed to have received a vision from Saint Cuthbert saying that the saint's remains should be laid to rest at Durham. According to legend, leading a monastic party at the time was Bishop Aldhun, who was as amazed as his followers when the cart carrying Saint Cuthbert of Lindisfarne’s shrine suddenly refused to move at “Wrdlau” and all their efforts to free it over the next three days were to no avail. During that time, one of the monks, Eadmer, had a vision in which it was revealed to him that Cuthbert’s shrine had to be taken to a place called Dunholme, but when he shared this information with the rest of the monks, it transpired that nobody knew where Dunholme was. Soon afterwards, two girls passed the place where the cart was stuck, one happening to ask the other if she had seen her lost cow, a brown beast. She had. It was, she said, at Dunholme. As the monks set off in the direction the girls had shown them, the cart could be moved easily and it was not long before the Cuthbert fraternity arrived at a piece of high ground surrounded by a great loop of the River Wear, modern Durham City. Cuthbert's remains were interred here and a monastic foundation was built here by Aldhun to house the shrine of Saint Cuthbert. Aldhun was the last Bishop of Lindisfarne (based at Chester-le-Street) and, according to legend as a result of his vision at Warden Law, the first Bishop of Durham.

The bishopric of Durham dates from 995, the present day Durham Cathedral replacing the 10th century "White Church" with the present cathedral being founded in AD 1093. The title 'Bishop of Lindisfarne' was transferred to 'Bishop of Durham' and the removal of the See (ecclesiastical jurisdiction) from Chester-le-Street to Durham took place in 995. . The hill is instantly recognisable from the B1404 road which runs adjacent to the site. The site is the location of several prehistoric burials and other remains, but it has a very confused history of discovery and excavation. This account is compiled from several sources, and tries to untangle the threads

References

Civil parishes in Tyne and Wear
City of Sunderland